Sede ("Seat") is a district of the municipality of Santa Maria, in the Brazilian state of Rio Grande do Sul. It is situated in the north portion of Santa Maria. Downtown Santa Maria is one of its bairros (neighbourhoods).

The district of Sede owns an area of 133.71 km² that is equivalent to 7.46% of the municipality of Santa Maria that is 1791,65 km².

History 
The district was created with the denomination of Santa Maria da Boca do Monte, by provincial law number 6 of 1837, November 17, thus, the district still belonged to the municipality of Cachoeira do Sul. After, as Seat of the municipality of Santa Maria, the district gave origin, for separation, to many another districts, and, some of them became municipalities like Itaara.

The district of Sede contains the Downtown Santa Maria.

In 1982, the district had its first official division in bairros, in 1986 are made small changes. However, it was created detached bairros before 1982, like is the case of Bairro Roberto Holtermann that was created in 1961, and nowadays is part of the Nossa Senhora de Fátima neighbourhood with the name of Vila Holtermann.

The bairros - neighbourhoods - of Sede created in 1986 endured up to 2006, when the city hall and the city council created the actual bairros of the district, and:

 It was created new bairros: Carolina, Divina Providência, Agroindustrial, Boi Morto, Renascença, Nova Santa Marta, São João, Campestre do Menino Deus, Menino Jesus, Bonfim, Nonoai, Nossa Senhora de Fátima, Diácono João Luiz Pozzobon, Lorenzi, Dom Antônio Reis, Duque de Caxias, Noal e Uglione.
 The bairro Cohab Camobi was extinguished and attached to bairro Camobi;
 The bairro Cohab Passo da Ferreira changed its name to Tancredo Neves; The bairro Parque Pinheiro Machado changed to Pinheiro Machado;

Difference between the division of 1986 (black lines) and of 2006 (bairros in colours).

Bairros from 1986 to 2006

A - Centro  B - Nossa Senhora das Dores  C - Nossa Senhora de Lourdes  D - Medianeira  E - Nossa Senhora do Rosário  F - Salgado Filho  G - Chácara das Flores  H - Nossa Senhora do Perpétuo Socorro  I - Itararé  J - Presidente João Goulart  K - Km Três  L - São José  M - Cerrito  N - Urlândia  O - Tomazzetti  P - Patronato  Q - Passo d'Areia  R - Juscelino Kubitschek  S - Caturrita  T - Pé de Plátano  U - Camobi  V - Cohab Camobi  W - Cohab Passo da Ferreira  X - Parque Pinheiro Machado

Bairros from 2006 on

1 - Centro  2 - Bonfim  3 - Nonoai  4 - Nossa Senhora de Fátima  5 - Nossa Senhora de Lourdes  6 - Nossa Senhora do Rosário  7 - Nossa Senhora Medianeira  8 - Camobi  9 - Carolina  10 - Caturrita  11 - Chácara das Flores  12 - Divina Providência  13 - Nossa Senhora do Perpétuo Socorro  14 - Salgado Filho  15 - Diácono João Luiz Pozzobon  16 - Cerrito  17 - Pé de Plátano  18 - São José  19 - Campestre do Menino Deus  20 - Itararé  21 - Km 3  22 - Menino Jesus  23 - Nossa Senhora das Dores  24 - Presidente João Goulart  25 - Lorenzi  26 - Tomazetti  27 - Urlândia 28 - Dom Antônio Reis  29 - Duque de Caxias  30 - Noal  31 - Passo d'Areia  32 - Patronato  33 - Uglione  34 - Agroindustrial  35 - Boi Morto  36 - Juscelino Kubitschek  37 - Pinheiro Machado  38 - Renascença  39 - Nova Santa Marta  40 - São João  41 - Tancredo Neves

Limits 

The district limits with the districts of Arroio Grande, Boca do Monte, Pains, Palma, Santo Antão and São Valentim, and with the municipality of Itaara.

Neighbourhoods 
The district of Sede is divided in the following bairros, that in English is equivalent to neighbourhoods:
 Agroindustrial
 Boi Morto  
 Bonfim  
 Camobi 
 Campestre do Menino Deus 
 Carolina 
 Caturrita 
 Centro 
 Cerrito 
 Chácara das Flores 
 Divina Providência 
 Dom Antônio Reis 
 Duque de Caxias 
 Itararé 
 Diácono João Luiz Pozzobon 
 Juscelino Kubitschek 
 Km 3
 Lorenzi 
 Menino Jesus
 Noal 
 Nonoai 
 Nossa Senhora das Dores 
 Nossa Senhora de Fátima 
 Nossa Senhora de Lourdes 
 Nossa Senhora do Perpétuo Socorro 
 Nossa Senhora do Rosário 
 Nossa Senhora Medianeira 
 Nova Santa Marta 
 Passo d'Areia 
 Patronato 
 Pé de Plátano 
 Pinheiro Machado 
 Presidente João Goulart 
 Renascença 
 Salgado Filho 
 São João 
 São José 
 Tancredo Neves 
 Tomazetti 
 Uglione 
 Urlândia

Roads and railway 
 The district centralizes one of the main railway junction in Rio Grande do Sul State.  
 In the district are the following highways:
 RSC-287: Connects Camobi to Palma, Porto Alegre, and all portion east of the Rio Grande do Sul State;
BR-158: In the district, the highway begins its portion north and ends in portion west;
RS-509: "Evandro Behr Avenue", is one of the main connection from Downtown Santa Maria to Camobi, where is the Universidade Federal de Santa Maria;
BR-392: Connects the district to districts of Pains, Passo do Verde and Santa Flora, and, with the all south portion of Rio Grande do Sul State;
BR-287: Connects the district with the district of Boca do Monte, and all portion west of the Rio Grande do Sul State;
Another important Streets are:
Nossa Senhora Medianeira Avenue;
Presidente Vargas Avenue;
Nossa Senhora das Dores Avenue;
Rio Branco Avenue;
Borges de Medeiros Avenue;
João Luiz Pozzobon Avenue;
Ângelo Bolson Avenue;
Hélvio Basso Avenue;
Walter Jobim Avenue;
Fernando Ferrari Avenue;
Liberdade Avenue;
Paulo Lauda Avenue;
do Acampamento Street;
Sete de Setembro Street;
Duque de Caxias Street;
Venâncio Aires Street;
Riachuelo Street;
Euclides da Cunha Street;
Vereador Antônio Dias Street.

References

External links 
Site oficial da Prefeitura de Santa Maria

Districts of Santa Maria, Rio Grande do Sul